Moussa Sanogo (born 16 July 1983) is a Ivorian former professional footballer who played as an attacking midfielder or striker.

Career
Like so many players of Ivorian origin, he began his career after coming through the famed youth academy at homeland club ASEC Abidjan, before moving to Belgian league club KSK Beveren. From here, he impressed enough to earn a transfer to rival Belgian club Brussels in 2005.

In January 2007, Sanogo moved to Maccabi Netanya in Israel, but was released after half a season.

In July 2008, after a year of not being active, Sanogo signed with FC Brussels for the second time in his career.

Sanogo joined Leeds United on trial, he was due to play in the friendly against Grimsby Town but did not receive international clearance.

In August 2009 he signed with RAEC Mons.

In December 2011, he moved to play for Vissai Ninh Bình in the V.League. In his first season with the club, he was Ninh Bình top scorer with 12 goals in 24 league games. The following season, he won the Vietnamese National Cup with Ninh Bình and again was the top scorer for the club with 10 goals in the league and 1 goals in the cup.

Honours
Belgian Cup:
Runner-up (1): 2003-04
Vietnamese National Cup:
Winner (1): 2013

References

External links
Stats

1983 births
Living people
Footballers from Abidjan
Ivorian footballers
K.S.K. Beveren players
R.W.D.M. Brussels F.C. players
R.A.E.C. Mons players
Maccabi Netanya F.C. players
Hoang Anh Gia Lai FC players
V.League 1 players
Ivorian expatriate footballers
Expatriate footballers in Belgium
Expatriate footballers in Israel
Expatriate footballers in Vietnam
Ivorian expatriate sportspeople in Belgium
Ivorian expatriate sportspeople in Israel
Ivorian expatriate sportspeople in Vietnam
Association football forwards